2010 Yokohama F. Marinos season

Competitions

Player statistics

Other pages
 J.League official site

Yokohama F. Marinos
Yokohama F. Marinos seasons